The Adventures of Martin Eden is a 1942 black-and-white adventure film directed by Sidney Salkow and starring Glenn Ford and Claire Trevor. It is based on Jack London's novel Martin Eden (1909).

Premise
Martin Eden (Glenn Ford) wants to be a writer but embarks as a sailor on a merchant ship. A storm hits the ship, which sinks. Martin escapes and decides to write about the experience.

Cast 
 Glenn Ford as Martin Eden
 Claire Trevor as Connie
 Stuart Erwin as Dawson
 Frank Conroy as Carl
 Evelyn Keyes as Ruth
 Ian MacDonald as Raglan
 Rafaela Ottiano as Maria
 Robert J. McDonald as Judge
 Uncredited actors include Filipino Hollywood actor Rudy Robles as San.

References 
The Continuum Encyclopedia of Children's Literature, By Bernice E. Cullinan,Diane Goetz Person

External links
 

Columbia Pictures films
1940s English-language films
Films about writers
Films based on works by Jack London
Films directed by Sidney Salkow
Films based on American novels
1942 adventure films
1942 films
Seafaring films
Films produced by B. P. Schulberg
American black-and-white films
American adventure films
1940s American films